Carlos Luciano da Silva (born 2 August 1975), nicknamed Mineiro, is a Brazilian former professional footballer who played as a defensive midfielder.

Despite being from the Brazilian state of Rio Grande do Sul his nickname "Mineiro" was given to him because of his shy and quiet personality, typical of someone from the state of Minas Gerais

Club career
Mineiro was born in Porto Alegre, Rio Grande do Sul. He won the Campeonato Paulista in 2004 and 2005, playing for São Caetano and São Paulo, respectively, and also won, playing for São Paulo, the Copa Libertadores de América and the FIFA Club World Championship in 2005.  On 18 December 2005, he scored the only goal in the final of the 2005 FIFA Club World Championship in Yokohama, Japan, against European champions Liverpool.

On 3 February 2007, he had his Bundesliga debut for Hertha BSC in a game against Hamburger SV. He was brought on for the last 20 minutes in place of Malik Fathi and scored his first goal for the Berlin club, a spectacular game-winning goal (2–1), shooting from more than 25 yards, in the last seconds of injury time.

On 24 September 2008, it was announced that Mineiro had signed for Chelsea as a backup for the injured Michael Essien until the end of the 2008–09 season. He made his Chelsea debut on 1 November 2008 against Sunderland in a league match. He came on for Nicolas Anelka who had already scored a hat-trick leading Chelsea to a 5–0 victory.

Despite already having played for Chelsea he was not formally revealed to the press until 7 November during a press conference at Chelsea's training ground in Cobham, Surrey. During the press conference it was confirmed that Mineiro was on a contract to play as Chelsea's third-choice defensive midfielder, behind Essien and Mikel John Obi. Mineiro played just twice for Chelsea, and his only start was against Burnley in the League Cup.

On 11 August 2009, he returned to Germany for the medical check and later signed with Schalke 04. He made his Schalke debut on 16 August 2009 in their first home game of the 2009–10 Bundesliga season, a 3–0 win against VfL Bochum, playing the entire match. At the end of the season, he left Schalke.

On 6 September 2011, TuS Koblenz, playing in the fourth tier of German football, surprisingly announced his signing, giving him a contract until the end of the season.

International career
Mineiro made his international debut in April 2001 against Peru.

Mineiro was a late call-up for Brazil's 2006 FIFA World Cup squad. A knee injury sustained by Barcelona midfielder Edmílson in the run-up to the tournament forced him to withdraw, resulting in a call-up for Mineiro, but he did not receive any playing time in Germany.

Mineiro was selected to participate in Copa América 2007. He started every match as Brazil went on to win the tournament. He retired from the national team in 2008.

Honours

Club
São Caetano
 São Paulo State Championship: 2004

São Paulo
 São Paulo State Championship: 2005
 Copa Libertadores: 2005
 FIFA Club World Cup: 2005
 Campeonato Brasileiro Série A: 2006

International
Brazil
 Copa América: 2007

Individual
 Campeonato Brasileiro Série A Team of the Year: 2006

References

External links
 
 

1975 births
Living people
Footballers from Porto Alegre
Brazilian footballers
Association football midfielders
Brazil international footballers
2006 FIFA World Cup players
2007 Copa América players
Guarani FC players
Associação Atlética Ponte Preta players
Rio Branco Esporte Clube players
Associação Desportiva São Caetano players
São Paulo FC players
Hertha BSC players
Chelsea F.C. players
FC Schalke 04 players
Campeonato Brasileiro Série A players
Bundesliga players
Premier League players
TuS Koblenz players
Copa América-winning players
Brazilian expatriate footballers
Brazilian expatriate sportspeople in Germany
Expatriate footballers in Germany
Brazilian expatriate sportspeople in England
Expatriate footballers in England
Brazilian emigrants to Australia